John H. Davis can refer to:
 John H. Davis (author) (1929–2012), American author
 John H. Davis (diplomat), American academic and diplomat
 John H. Davis (publisher)

See also 
 Jack Davis (actor) (born John H. Davis, 1914–1992), American actor